Princess Caroline Elizabeth of Great Britain (10 June 1713 – 28 December 1757) was the fourth child and third daughter of King George II of Great Britain and his wife Caroline of Ansbach.

Early life
Princess Caroline was born at Herrenhausen Palace in Hanover, Germany, on 10 June 1713 (New Style Gregorian calendar). Her father was George Augustus, Hereditary Prince of Hanover, the eldest son of George Louis, Elector of Hanover. Her mother was Caroline of Ansbach, daughter of Johann Friedrich, Margrave of Brandenburg-Ansbach. As a granddaughter of the Elector of Hanover, she was styled Princess Caroline of Hanover at birth. Under the Act of Settlement 1701, she was seventh in the line of succession to the British throne. She was baptised the day after her birth at Herrenhausen Palace.

Great Britain
In 1714, Queen Anne died and Caroline's grandfather became George I and her father Prince of Wales. At the age of one year, Caroline accompanied her mother and elder sisters, the Princesses Anne and Amelia, to Great Britain, and the family resided at St James's Palace, London. She was then styled as a Princess of Great Britain. A newly attributed list from January–February 1728 documents her personal expenses, including charitable contributions to several Protestant groups in London.

In 1722, at the direction of her mother, she was inoculated against smallpox by variolation, an early type of immunisation popularised by Lady Mary Wortley Montagu and Charles Maitland.

Princess Caroline was her mother's favourite, and became known as "the truth-telling Caroline Elizabeth" (or "the truth-loving"). When any disagreement took place among the royal children, her parents would say, "Send for Caroline, and then we shall know the truth!" According to Dr. John Doran, "The truth-loving Caroline Elizabeth was unreservedly beloved by her parents, was worthy of the affection, and repaid it by an ardent attachment. She was fair, good, accomplished and unhappy."

Later life

According to popular belief, Caroline's unhappiness was due to her love for the married courtier Lord Hervey. Hervey, who was bisexual, may have had an affair with Caroline's elder brother, Prince Frederick, and was romantically linked with several ladies of the court as well. When Hervey died in 1743, Caroline retired to St. James's Palace for many years prior to her own death, accessible to only her family and closest friends. She gave generously to charity.

Princess Caroline died, unmarried and childless, on 28 December 1757, aged 44, at St James's Palace. She was buried at Westminster Abbey.

Horace Walpole, of the death of Princess Caroline, wrote: "Though her state of health had been so dangerous for years, and her absolute confinement for many of them, her disorder was, in a manner, new and sudden, and her death unexpected by herself, though earnestly her wish. Her goodness was constant and uniform, her generosity immense, her charities most extensive; in short, I, no royalist, could be lavish in her praise."

Arms
On 31 January 1719, as a grandchild of the sovereign, Caroline was granted use of the arms of the realm, differenced by a label argent of five points, each bearing three roses gules. On 30 August 1727, as a child of the sovereign, Caroline's difference changed to a label argent of three points, each bearing three roses gules.

Ancestors

See also
List of British princesses
House of Hanover

Notes

References

Sources
 

1713 births
1757 deaths
18th-century British people
18th-century British women
British princesses
Nobility from Hanover
House of Hanover
Burials at Westminster Abbey
German people of Scottish descent
Children of George II of Great Britain
British people of German descent
Daughters of kings